Dmytro Doroshchuk (born 29 September 1986) is a Ukrainian handball player for Wybrzeże Gdańsk (handball) and the Ukrainian national team.

He represented Ukraine at the 2020 European Men's Handball Championship.

References

1986 births
Living people
Ukrainian male handball players
Sportspeople from Volyn Oblast
Expatriate handball players
Ukrainian expatriate sportspeople in Belarus
Ukrainian expatriate sportspeople in Israel
Ukrainian expatriate sportspeople in Portugal
HC Motor Zaporizhia players
Sporting CP handball players
ZTR players
21st-century Ukrainian people